Egyptian sceptre can refer to:

 Was (sceptre), a hieroglyph symbol and sceptre associated with Egyptian gods and pharaohs
 Sekhem scepter, a ritual sceptre associated with power, authority, and the god Osiris
 Certain Egyptian administrative divisions called nomes were named for sceptres
Heq-At (Prospering Spectre), centred around Heliopolis/modern-day Cairo in Lower Egypt
Waset (nome) (Sceptre), centred around Thebes/modern-day Karnak in Upper Egypt
Uab (nome) (Two Sceptres), centred around Oxyrhynchus/modern-day El-Bahnasa in Upper Egypt